The Hangman Waits is a 1947 British thriller film directed by A. Barr Smith about a sadistic killer who works as an organist in an Eastbourne theatre. It stars Beatrice Campbell, John Turnbull, Anthony Baird and David Mowbray.

References

External links
 

1947 films
British thriller films
1940s British films